The Réseau de Transport en Commun de Shawinigan is the public transit service provider in Shawinigan, Québec. It operates two routes from Monday to Friday and one route on Saturdays and Sundays. The regular hours of operation for Route 1 are 6:30am to 5:30pm Monday to Friday. Route 2 runs from 6:55am to 9:55pm from Monday to Wednesday and from 6:55am to 11:55pm on Thursday and Friday. Route 3 operates 6:30am to 11:30pm on Saturday and 7:30am to 9:30pm on Sundays

During the summer, only one route operates Monday-Sunday. The summer hours of operation are 6:30am to 9:30pm from Monday to Wednesday, 6:30am to 11:30pm Thursday to Saturday, and 7:30am to 9:30pm on Sundays. An on demand service called Accès-Bus and an adapted transit service for residents with physical disabilities are also provided.

References

Shawinigan
Transport in Shawinigan